Many inhabited places in Attica Prefecture of Greece have both Arvanitic and Greek forms. Some of the forms are identifiably of Greek origin, others of Arvanitic, yet others of Turkish or more obscure origins. Renamings were done to place Greek names first on places with Arvanitic and Turkish names.

Notes
 Official sources do not state when the town was renamed. The town had both Koropi and Koursalas as official names until somewhere around 1847–1899.

References

Attica
Attica